Hairline Cracks is a 1990 children's novel by Andrew Taylor.

When Sam and his friend Mo begin to investigate his mother's disappearance, they put themselves in danger as they learn about hairline cracks in the silos of a nuclear plant and the ruthlessness of men who want this kept secret.

References

1990 American novels
American children's novels
Children's mystery novels
1990 children's books